Alexandrovsky Zavod is a rural locality (a selo) and the administrative center of Alexandrovo-Zavodsky District of Zabaykalsky Krai, Russia.

Geography
It is located on the river Gazimur, 510 km to the south-east from Chita, 130 km to the north-east from the nearest railway station. There is a library, a hospital, a post office and other social and welfare facilities.

History
Alexandrovsky Zavod was founded in 1792 in connection with the establishment of a silver mining and metallurgical plant. In 1825, it received its present name after the death in the same year Russian Emperor Alexander I. The town has been the home to political prisoners since 1832. The plant was closed in 1863. In 1926, it became the capital of the district. A museum opened in the house of Nikolay Chernyshevsky in 1969. An airport operated in the town until the 1990s.

Demographics
Population:

References

Rural localities in Zabaykalsky Krai
1790s establishments in the Russian Empire